Our Girl is a British television military drama series, written and created by Tony Grounds, first broadcast on BBC One on 24 March 2013. Following a feature-length pilot episode, a full series of five episodes was commissioned, commencing broadcast on 21 September 2014.

Series overview

Episodes

Pilot (2013)

Series 1 (2014)

Series 2 (2016)

Series 3 (2017–18)

Series 4 (2020)

Footnotes

References

External links
 
 Our Girl at BBC Programmes

Our Girl